Cachar College is a co-educational institution established in 1960 at Silchar, India. It offers Intermediate (10+2 level) and First Degree Level (10+2+3 level) courses in Arts, Commerce and Science. The college is recognized by the UGC under Sections 2(f) and 12 (B) and is affiliated to Assam University, Silchar. The college has been accredited by National Assessment and Accreditation Council (NAAC) with B status.

The college's mission is "to keep its promises to the students and to learn from its past experiences".

History
In the early 1960s, the need for an additional institute of higher education was felt in Silchar. As a result, Cachar College was established on 20 June 1960. The college got its affiliation for Arts and Commerce streams under Gauhati University during the 1961–62 academic session.

The college started in a temporary campus and shifted to the present permanent site in 1961. The Science stream of the college was initiated in 1981-82. After Assam University started functioning in 1994, undergraduate courses of the college became affiliated under Assam University, Silchar.

The Intermediate (10+2 level) courses of the college are affiliated under the Assam Higher Secondary Education Council.

Location
Cachar College is located on the Trunk Road, Silchar. The college is about one km from the Silchar Railway Station, twenty km from Silchar Airport and less than 1 km from the Assam State Transport Corporation (ASTC) Flag Station and other private bus terminuses. The college is well connected by road and water transport with nearby areas.

Campus
The main campus of the college is on a  plot and houses the academic and administrative wings along with the support services. The hostel is nearby.

Courses
Cachar College offers Intermediate and Undergraduate in Arts, Science and Commerce streams. In addition, the college offers self-financing career-oriented programs. As per government regulations, there is reservation of seats for Scheduled Cast, Scheduled Tribe, Other Backward Class and MOBC students. In addition, Tea Association of India (TAI) and Surma Valley Branch of Indian Tea Association (SVBITA) enjoy reservation under the donor quota.

Intermediate programs
The college offers two-year Higher Secondary courses in Arts, Science and Commerce streams, the academic aspects of which are governed by the Assam Higher Secondary Education Council (AHSEC). The course is split into two years with two year-end examinations with the examinations conducted by the AHSEC. The college operates in two shifts — day and afternoon — with the combined intake capacity being 300 for Arts, 240 for Commerce and 120 for Science streams respectively.

Undergraduate programs
Cachar College offers three-year degree courses (TDC) under the affiliation of Assam University, Silchar in Arts, Commerce and Science streams, leading to B.A., B.Com and B.Sc degrees. Student intake capacity of the college for Arts is 150 for day shift and 150 for afternoon shift. For Science and Commerce, the intake capacity is 120 for day shift only. The Honours course is available for day shift students only.

Career-oriented programs
The college, with the help of University Grants Commission, has introduced career-oriented programmes, which can be pursued along with other regular courses like B.A, B.Com, B.Sc, etc. On successful completion of such a course, a student obtains a certificate/diploma awarded jointly by Cachar College and Assam University. The college offers a one-year certificate course, two-year diploma course and three-year advance diploma course in Business Insurance, Computer Application (data care only) and Office Management & Secretarial Practice.

Facilities

Scholarship
Cachar College has an Aid and Award Committee, which looks after the provision of aids to the needy students and awards for the meritorious ones. Soumyajit Guha Merit Award in Bengali and Economics go to the best performers from the college in Bengali and Economics Honours.

Library
The college has a central library with borrowing, reading and reference sections. There are smaller departmental libraries.

Hostel
The college has a hostel for girls.

Book bank
The Students' Union runs a book bank with support from the Central Library.

Central Computer Centre
The Central Computer Centre, which is attached to the Department of Commerce, serves the students from B.Com and B.Sc (Physics Honours) courses having practical papers on computer applications. It is also used for training of the faculty.

Canteen
The college has a cafeteria which remains open during the class hours as well as examination hours. Cachar College Employees’ Thrift and Amenities Cooperative Limited operates a temporary sale outlet during and after admission days from where the students have to buy their uniforms.

Common rooms
The college has Boys’ and Girls' Common Rooms with indoor games and recreational facilities. Additionally, the Girls’ Common Room has good sitting arrangements with a cloak room and a female attendant for any service required.

Health Centre
The college has a health center with a trained nurse and emergency first aid facilities. It has an agreement with a private nursing home for round-the clock-medical services.

Gymnasium
The college has a gymnasium in the Boys' Common Room. The gymnasium is however out of service.

References

Universities and colleges in Assam
Silchar
Assam University
Educational institutions established in 1960
1960 establishments in Assam
Colleges affiliated to Assam University